The 2021–22 season is the club's eight season in existence and in the Indian Super League, since their establishment in 2014.

Background 
The ISL announced a rule limiting the number of foreign players, which would go in effect from the 2021-22 season.

Competitions

Indian Super League

Durand Cup

References 

FC Goa seasons
2021–22 Indian Super League season by team